Al Maafer District is a district of the Taiz Governorate, Yemen. As of 2003, the district had a population of 110,924 inhabitants.

Location
It is located in the southern part of Taiz governorate. it is bordered by Al-Misrakh to the north, Ash Shamayatayn to the south, Same'a and Al-Mawasit to the east and Jabal Habashy to the west.

References

 
Districts of Taiz Governorate